Usep Munandar (born December 17, 1981 in Bandung) is an Indonesian former professional footballer who played as a defender.

Honors

Clubs
PSMS Medan:
Liga Indonesia Premier Division runner−up : (2007)

References

External links
 

1981 births
Association football defenders
Living people
Sundanese people
Indonesian footballers
West Java sportspeople
Indonesia international footballers
Liga 1 (Indonesia) players
Persiba Balikpapan players
Persik Kediri players
Persisam Putra Samarinda players
Indonesian Premier Division players
PS Barito Putera players
Persib Bandung players
PSMS Medan players
Indonesian Premier League players
Arema F.C. players
Borneo F.C. players
Sportspeople from Bandung